Screen Snapshots are a series of documentary short subjects produced by Columbia Pictures (and its predecessor CBC Film Sales Corporation) between 1920 and 1958. They featured behind-the-scenes footage of Hollywood stars of the day at various Hollywood events or parties.

History 

In 1919, Jack Cohn, brother of future Columbia president Harry Cohn, wanted short one-reel size films showing the reality of Hollywood. 
The two brothers created Hall Room Boys Photoplays, with Harry in Los Angeles to produce and Jack in New York for distribution. While Harry considered himself in charge of everything the company made, it was Jack's project and so he brought in Louis Lewyn to coproduce.

From about 1930, these short documentaries were almost exclusively written, produced and directed (and occasionally edited and narrated) by Ralph Staub, until the series was discontinued in 1958. They usually ran for 9 or 10 minutes and were shown in cinema theatres like newsreels alongside main features.

Awards
Three of these documentary shorts were nominated for an Academy Award, Best Short Subject, One-reel, all produced by Staub. They are:
 Screen Snapshots Series 23, No. 1: Hollywood in Uniform (1944)
 Screen Snapshots' 50th Anniversary of Motion Pictures (1945)
 Screen Snapshots Series 25, No. 1: 25th Anniversary (1946)

References 
Citations

Works cited

External links

Film series introduced in 1920
English-language films
American black-and-white films
American short documentary films
Columbia Pictures short films
Documentary film series
Documentary films about Hollywood, Los Angeles
Films shot in California